

Buildings and structures

Buildings

 1660 – Completion of
 Moti Masjid (Pearl Mosque) in the Red Fort of Delhi.
 Teele Wali Masjid, Lucknow in the regin of Mughal Emperor Aurangzeb, Built in the supervision of Fidai Khan Koka.
 Tilya-Kori Madrasah in the Registan of Samarkand (begun in 1646).
 1661 – Work begins on Versailles, near Paris.
 1662
 King Charles Court of the Greenwich Hospital in London, designed by John Webb.
 Pažaislis Monastery founded (completed in 1755).
 Coleshill House in the Vale of White Horse, England, designed by Roger Pratt, completed (begun in 1649).
 Groombridge Place in Kent, England, built Philip Packer for himself.
 1660-1663 – The arsenal of Civitavecchia designed by Gianlorenzo Bernini built
 1663–1665 – Kingston Lacy in Dorset and Horseheath Hall in Cambridgeshire, both in England and both designed by Roger Pratt, built.
 1664–1667 – Clarendon House in London, designed by Roger Pratt, built.
 1664 – Eltham Lodge near London, designed by Hugh May, completed.
 1665
 1 June – Petersberg Citadel, Erfurt, Germany foundation stone laid
 21 September  – New chapel at Pembroke College, Cambridge, England, Christopher Wren's first completed work of architecture, is dedicated.
 Chapel of Brasenose College, Oxford is consecrated.
 Sant'Andrea al Quirinale in Rome, designed by Bernini, is completed.
 1667
 January 27 – The Opernhaus am Taschenberg in Dresden, designed by Wolf Caspar von Klengel, is opened.
 Saint Peter's Square in the Vatican City, designed by Bernini, is completed.
 1669
 July 9 – Sheldonian Theatre in Oxford, England, designed by Christopher Wren for University ceremonial, is inaugurated.
 September 28 – Second Royal Exchange, London, designed by Edward Jarman, is opened for business.
 Alamgir Mosque, Varanasi, is built.

Events
 1661 – English astronomer Christopher Wren advises on repairs to Old St Paul's Cathedral in London and declines appointment to direct new fortifications at Tangier, his earliest known direct involvement with practical architecture.
 1666: September 2–5 – The Great Fire of London destroys most of the city including Old St Paul's Cathedral.
 1667: August 18 – In an effort to prevent narrow streets from being blocked from all light by tall buildings, the city of Paris enacts its first building code limiting the height of new construction. Buildings may be no taller than eight toise  —  — tall. In 1783, rules are implemented to consider the width of the street.
 1668 – Roger Pratt becomes the first person knighted for services to architecture.
 1668: June – William Talman appointed Comptroller of the King's Works in England.
 1669: March 19 – Christopher Wren appointed Surveyor of the King's Works in England.

Births
 1660 – Jakob Prandtauer, Austrian Baroque architect (died 1726)
 1661 – Daniel Marot, French architect (died 1752)
 1661: May 7 – George Clarke, English politician, scholar and amateur architect (died 1736)
 1661 (probable date) – Nicholas Hawksmoor, English architect (died 1736)
 1664: January 24 – John Vanbrugh, English dramatist and architect (died 1726)
 1666: March 15 – George Bähr, German architect, designer of Protestant churches (died 1738)
 1668 – Johann Lukas von Hildebrandt, Austrian Baroque architect (died 1745)
 c. 1668 – Thomas Archer, English architect (died 1743)

Deaths
 1666
January 28 – Tommaso Dingli, Maltese architect (born 1591)
September 23 – François Mansart, French architect (born 1598)
 1667: August 3 – Francesco Borromini, Italian Baroque architect (born 1599)
 1669: May 16 – Pietro da Cortona, Italian Baroque architect (born 1596)

Architecture